Jack Joseph Dongarra  (born July 18, 1950) is an American computer scientist and mathematician. He is the American University Distinguished Professor of Computer Science in the Electrical Engineering and Computer Science Department at the University of Tennessee. He holds the position of a Distinguished Research Staff member in the Computer Science and Mathematics Division at Oak Ridge National Laboratory, Turing Fellowship in the School of Mathematics at the University of Manchester, and is an adjunct professor in the Computer Science Department at Rice University. He served as a faculty fellow at the Texas A&M University Institute for Advanced Study (2014–2018). Dongarra is the founding director of the Innovative Computing Laboratory at the University of Tennessee. He was the recipient of the Turing Award in 2021.

Education
Dongarra received a BSc degree in Mathematics from Chicago State University in 1972 and a MSc degree in Computer Science from the Illinois Institute of Technology in 1973. In 1980, he received PhD in Applied Mathematics from the University of New Mexico under the supervision of Cleve Moler.

Research and career
Dongarra worked at the Argonne National Laboratory until 1989, becoming a senior scientist. He specializes in numerical algorithms in linear algebra, parallel computing, the use of advanced computer architectures, programming methodology, and tools for parallel computers. His research includes the development, testing, and documentation of high-quality mathematical software. He has contributed to the design and implementation of the following open-source software packages and systems: EISPACK, LINPACK, the Basic Linear Algebra Subprograms (BLAS), Linear Algebra Package (LAPACK), ScaLAPACK, Parallel Virtual Machine (PVM), Message Passing Interface (MPI), NetSolve, TOP500, Automatically Tuned Linear Algebra Software (ATLAS), High-Performance Conjugate Gradient (HPCG) and Performance Application Programming Interface (PAPI). These libraries excel in the accuracy of the underlying numerical algorithms and the reliability and performance of the software. They benefit a very wide range of users through their incorporation into software including MATLAB, Maple, Wolfram Mathematica, GNU Octave, the R programming language, SciPy, and others.

With Eric Grosse, Dongarra pioneered the distribution via email and the web of numeric open-source code collected in Netlib. He has published approximately 300 articles, papers, reports, and technical memoranda, and he is the co-author of several books. He holds appointments with Oak Ridge National Laboratory and the University of Manchester, where he has served as a Turing Fellow since 2007.

Awards and honors
In 2004, Dongarra was awarded the IEEE Sid Fernbach Award for his contributions in the application of high-performance computers using innovative approaches. In 2008, he was the recipient of the first IEEE Medal of Excellence in Scalable Computing. In 2010, Dongarra was the first recipient of the SIAM Activity Group on Supercomputing Career Prize. In 2011, he was the recipient of the IEEE Computer Society Charles Babbage Award. In 2013, he was the recipient of the ACM/IEEE Ken Kennedy Award for his leadership in designing and promoting standards for mathematical software used to solve numerical problems common to high-performance computing. In 2019, Dongarra received the SIAM/ACM Prize in Computational Science. In 2020, he received the IEEE Computer Pioneer Award for leadership in the area of high-performance mathematical software.

Dongarra was elected a Fellow of the American Association for the Advancement of Science (AAAS), the Association for Computing Machinery (ACM), the Society for Industrial and Applied Mathematics (SIAM), and the Institute of Electrical and Electronics Engineers (IEEE) and a foreign member of the Russian Academy of Sciences and a foreign member of the Royal Society (ForMemRS). In 2001, he was elected a member of the US National Academy of Engineering for contributions to numerical software, parallel and distributed computation, and problem-solving environments.

Dongarra received the 2021 Turing Award for pioneering concepts and methods which resulted in world-changing computations. His algorithms and software are regarded to have fueled the growth of high-performance computing and had significant impacts in many areas of computational science, from artificial intelligence to computer graphics.

References

External links

 
 
 
 
 Talk by Turing Award Winner Prof. Jack Dongarra(live streamed on May 27, 2022 from TU Darmstadt)

1950 births
Living people
American computer scientists
Fellows of the Association for Computing Machinery
Fellow Members of the IEEE
Chicago State University alumni
Illinois Institute of Technology alumni
University of New Mexico alumni
Oak Ridge National Laboratory people
Academics of the University of Manchester
Fellows of the Society for Industrial and Applied Mathematics
University of Tennessee faculty
Place of birth missing (living people)
Members of the United States National Academy of Engineering
Foreign Members of the Russian Academy of Sciences
Foreign Members of the Royal Society
People associated with the Department of Computer Science, University of Manchester
Fellows of the American Association for the Advancement of Science
Turing Award laureates
American people of Italian descent
Rice University faculty